The DeWolf family (also spelled D’Wolf or DeWolfe) is a prominent Canadian and American family that traces its roots to Balthazar DeWolf.

Balthazar DeWolf 
Balthazar DeWolf (d. about 1696) is first mentioned in the records of Hartford, Connecticut, in 1656. He married a woman named Alice by 1646, it is not known where. Some believe she was Alice Peck, born on 26 February 1625, in Liddington, Rutland, England, a daughter of William Peck and Elizabeth Holt. They had at least five children. After 1668 they settled in Lyme, Connecticut. 

It is thought that Balthazar DeWolf was from the Livonian branch of DeWolfs, which is an offshoot of the Saxon branch. However, that is only one of the most commonly cited versions, others mentioning that Balthazar DeWolf was a Huguenot, or Pole, or Russian, or Jew, or Dutch, or German. There is a high possibility that DeWolf was English or educated in England as he and his children only married to other English settlers, which was very common at the time.

Both Nova Scotia's and Rhode Island's DeWolfs are descendants of Balthazar DeWolf as shown below:

 Balthazar DeWolf (d. about 1696), m. Alice  (–1687)
 Edward DeWolf (~1646 – 1712), m.  Rebecca , had at least three sons
 Simon DeWolf (1671–1704), m. Martha, who later m. Nathaniel Clark
 John DeWolf 
 Nathan DeWolf (1720 – March 29, 1789), probably son of John, m. 1. Lydia Kirtland; 2. Anna (Prentis) Witter; emigrated to Nova Scotia.
 Josiah DeWolf 
 Charles DeWolf (1673–1731), m. Prudence Beckwith (1676–1737)
 Charles DeWolf of Guadeloupe (1695–1726), m. Margaret Potter
 Simon DeWolf (1718 or 19 – )
 Prudence DeWolf (1721 – )
 Sarah DeWolf (1724 – )
 Mark Anthony DeWolf (1726–1793), m. Abigail Potter (1726–1809); patriarch of the Bristol branch
 Matthew DeWolf (1704 – )
 Patience DeWolf (1722 – )
 Ezra DeWolf (1723 – )
 Matthew DeWolf, m. 1. Eunice Baker; 2. Elizabeth Burchard
 Samuel DeWolf (1727 – )
 Peter DeWolf (1730 – )
 Edward DeWolf (1735 – )
 John DeWolf 
 Stephen DeWolf 
 Lyman DeWolf 
 Prudence DeWolf 
 Mary DeWolf 
 Elizabeth DeWolf  
 Rebekah DeWolf 
 Joseph DeWolf (1717–1757) of Glastonbury, Connecticut, m. Tabitha Johnson
 Abdi (or Abda) Dolph (1743 – ), m. Mary Coleman; changed the spelling of his last name from DeWolf to Dolph; forefather of Joseph N. Dolph and Cyrus A. Dolph
 Prudence DeWolf 
 Benjamin DeWolf (1675–1734), m. Susannah Douglas
 Simeon DeWolf (1713/19 – 1780/85), m. Parnell Kirtland, emigrated to Nova Scotia
 Elizabeth DeWolf (1742 – ), m. William Andrews
 Hon. Benjamin DeWolf (1744–1819), m. Rachel Otis (1741–1807), daughter of Nathaniel Kirtland and Phoebe (Marvin) DeWolf; forefather of Eliza Amelia Gore (1829–1916), for twenty-eight years Lady-in-waiting to Queen Victoria.
 John DeWolf ( – 1812), m. 1. Susanna Hatch; 2. Elizabeth Graham
 James DeWolf (1762–1834), m. 1. Keturah Calkin; 2. Nancy Lawrence; 3. Jane Parker
 Charles DeWolf (1765 – ), m. Sabra Harding; 2. Sarah Miner
 Lucy DeWolf, m. Jonathan Wilson 
 Edward DeWolf 
 Stephen DeWolf ( – 1711), m. Elizabeth
 Gideon DeWolf  
 Stephen DeWolf 
 Charles DeWolf 
 Simon DeWolf (~1648 – 1695), m. Sarah Lay
 Simon DeWolf (1682/82 – 1707)
 Sarah DeWolf (1685 – )
 John DeWolf (1687 – ), died unmarried
 Josiah DeWolf (1689–1767), m. 1. Anna Waterman; 2. Abigail (Comstock) Lord
 Phoebe DeWolf (1691/92 – ), m. Joseph Mather
 Daniel DeWolf (1693–1715), m. Phoebe Marvin, who m. Nathaniel Kirtland
 Jabez DeWolf 
 Stephen DeWolf (1652–1702), m. 1. Sarah Terry; 2. Hannah Jones
 Edward DeWolf (1686 – )
 Deborah DeWolf (1690 – ), m. Aaaron Huntley 
 Hannah Huntley (1708–1796), m. Ebenezer Mack
 Hannah DeWolf (1693 – )
 Stephen DeWolf (1694–1723), m. Hannah
 Lewis DeWolf, lived in Lyme, was blind
 Benjamin DeWolf Jr (1716 – ), m. Lucy Champion
 Edward DeWolf
 Josiah DeWolf (1723 – )
 Benjamin DeWolf (1695 – ), m. Margaret ( – 1742); moved to Killingworth, Connecticut 
 Jehiel DeWolf (1725–1727)
 Hester DeWolf (1726–1736)
 Jehiel DeWolf 2nd (1727/31 – 1798), m. Phoebe Cobb; emigrated to Nova Scotia
 Phoebe DeWolf, m. Ezekiel Comstock
 Jehiel DeWolf (1755 – ), m. 1. Elizabeth Martin; 2. Anna Witter
 Margaret DeWolf, m. 1. Samuel Witter; 2. James Brown
 Oliver DeWolf, m. Amy Bishop
 Daniel DeWolf, m. Lydia Kirtland Harris
 Jerusha DeWolf, m. Peter Martin
 Eunice DeWolf, m. Caleb Forsyth
 Lydia DeWolf, m. 1. Samuel Starr; 2. Cyrus Peck; 3. Moses Stevens; with Samuel they are great-grandparents of Rev. Arthur Wentworth Hamilton Eaton.
 Stephen DeWolf (1731 – )
 Phoebe DeWolf (1731–1736)  
 Elijah DeWolf (1733 – ), m. Submit Wilcox
 Esther DeWolf (1736–1818), m. a Wheeler
 Phoebe DeWolf (1741–1742)
 Lewis DeWolf (1698 – )
 Edward DeWolf (1736 – ), m. Hannah Ely
 Phoebe DeWolf (1701 – )
 Josiah DeWolf 
 Mary DeWolf (1655 or 56 – 1724), m. 1. Thomas Lee (1644–1704)(died), 1676; 2. Matthew Griswold of Lyme, 1705, connecting the DeWolfs to the Griswold family 
 Hannah (Lee) Griswold, m. Judge John Griswold
 Matthew Griswold, the 17th Governor of Connecticut.
 Phoebe Griswold 
 Susannah DeWolf (1664–1735), m. 1. Henry Champion, 1684; 2. John Huntley, 1709
 Joseph DeWolf (probably) (1668–1719)

Rhode Island branch 
The Bristol or Rhode Island branch sprang from Charles DeWolf of Guadeloupe (1695–1726), who was born in Lyme, New London, Connecticut, the son of Charles DeWolf and Prudence DeWolf. He emigrated to Guadeloupe, the French West Indies. During the 18th and 19th centuries the D'Wolfs of Rhode Island were the largest slave traders in the state.

Notable members 

Mark Anthony DeWolf (1726–1793) was the fourth child of Charles DeWolf, the only one who returned to America. He became the patriarch of the Bristol branch of the family; he was a merchant and slave trader.
James DeWolf (1764–1837), son of Mark Anthony DeWolf. He was one of the richest men of his time, making the majority of his fortune in the slave trade.
 General George W. DeWolf (1778–1844), a grandson of Mark Anthony DeWolf. He was a slave trader and the original owner of Linden Place.
Capt. John DeWolf (1779–1872), a grandson of Mark Anthony DeWolf through his son Simon DeWolf. He was also known as John DeWolf II and "Norwest John". After many years exploring the coast of Alaska and the Northwest on the board of the ship Juno, he crossed the Pacific Ocean, then Siberia all way to St. Petersburg, Russia, by land, becoming the first American who crossed Asia. He captured this 1804–1807 expedition in his 1861 book A Voyage to the North Pacific and a Journey through Siberia More Than Half a Century Ago.
Mark Antony De Wolfe Howe (1808–1895), a great-grandson of Mark Anthony DeWolf through Abigail (DeWolf) Ingraham (1755–1833), one of Mark Anthony's daughters. He was an Episcopal priest and later first Bishop of the Episcopal Diocese of Central Pennsylvania, the present-day Episcopal Diocese of Bethlehem.
Theodora Goujaud DeWolf Colt (1820–1901), a daughter of George DeWolf. She was a published poet. She is credited with restoring Linden Place into one of the most famous mansions in New England. She was mother of LeBaron Bradford Colt and Samuel P. Colt.
Charles DeWolf Brownell (1822–1909), son of Lucia Emilia DeWolf Brownell, granddaughter of Mark Anthony DeWolf. He was an American painter, best known for his landscape views.
Mark Antony De Wolfe Howe Jr. (1864–1960), one of the sixteen children of Mark Antony De Wolfe Howe. He was an American editor and author, a recipient of the 1925 Pulitzer Prize for Biography or Autobiography.
Charles Dana Gibson (1867–1944) was an American illustrator.

Legacy 
DeWolf avenue in Bristol, Rhode Island is named after the DeWolfs.

In total, the Bristol DeWolfs are believed to have transported more than 11,000 slaves to the United States before the African slave trade was banned in 1808.

DeWolfs of Nova Scotia 
In 1761, three of Balthazar DeWolf's descendants, Simeon, Nathan and Jehiel DeWolf, with households amounting to 19 persons immigrated to Horton Township, Nova Scotia, to settle in the Grand Pre area. Evelyn M. Salisbury's genealogy published in 1892 identified the three men as cousins and it also appeared in A. W. H. Eaton's, History of Kings County, despite Eaton's efforts to change some parts of Salisbury's genealogy. In 1991 the publication of Dophs and De Wolfs by Carol Stark Maginnis after extensive research of original sources, reviewing the correspondence between Rev. Eaton and Mrs. Stainsbury, and examining the research of the Lyme Study Group, concluded the men were three sons of Benjamin DeWolf Sr. (born in October 1695), who was a son of Steven and grandson of Balthazar. This matches Eaton's original belief the Nova Scotia family were descendants of Steven DeWolf, which had been disregarded in Salisbury's work, and which he then unfortunately copied in his own books.

Notable members 

Nathan DeWolf (1720 – March 29, 1789) was born in Saybrook, Connecticut. He graduated Artium Magister at Yale College, New Haven in 1743. Moved to Horton in 1761. For many years he was senior Justice of the peace for King's County, Nova Scotia.
Benjamin DeWolf (1744–1819) was a businessman and political figure in Nova Scotia, he is third cousin to Mark Anthony DeWolf.
Loran DeWolf (1754 – after 1818) was a political figure in Nova Scotia.
Elisha DeWolf (1756–1837) was born in Saybrook, Connecticut. He was a son of Nathan DeWolf and served as a judge and political figure in Nova Scotia.
James Ratchford DeWolf (1787–1855) was a merchant and political figure in Nova Scotia. He was the fifth child of Elisha DeWolf.
Thomas Andrew Strange DeWolf (1795–1878) was a merchant and political figure in Nova Scotia. He represented King's County in the Nova Scotia House of Assembly from 1837 to 1848. He was the ninth child of Elisha DeWolf.
Elisha DeWolf Jr. (1801–1850) was a political figure in Nova Scotia. He was the eleventh child of Elisha DeWolf.
Dr. James Ratchford DeWolf (1818–1901) was a physician and asylum superintendent. He is the eldest son of Thomas Andrew Strange DeWolf. In 1841, he graduated from the Royal College of Surgeons, Edinburgh.
Alice Starr (Chipman) Tilley (1844–1921) was the wife of Hon. Sir Samuel Leonard Tilley, C.B., K.C.M.G., late Minister of Finance and the Lieutenant Governor of New Brunswick. She was a granddaughter of William, the second child of Elisha DeWolf. She is mother of Leonard Percy de Wolfe Tilley, the 21st Premier of New Brunswick.
Rev. Arthur Wentworth Hamilton Eaton (1849–1937) was a Protestant Episcopal clergyman, educator and scholar.
Vice Admiral Harry DeWolf CBE, DSO, DSC, CD (1903–2000) was a Canadian naval officer who was famous as the first commander of HMCS Haida during the Second World War.
James DeWolfe (b. 1949) is a former political figure in Nova Scotia. He represented Pictou East in the Nova Scotia House of Assembly from 1998 to 2006 as a Progressive Conservative.

Legacy 
Wolfville, Nova Scotia was renamed after the DeWolf family. Elisha DeWolf, Jr. was the postmaster of the community when the postal district name became official on August 13, 1830, replacing prior names including Mud Creek and Upper Horton. It was suggested the change was out of respect for his namesake father, Elisha DeWolf.

Other DeWolfs 

 Delos DeWolf (1811–1882), a prominent citizen of Oswego, New York, United States, a politician and a banker.  
 Calvin DeWolf (1815–1899), a prominent lawyer and the first secretary of the Illinois chapter of the American Anti-Slavery Society.
Joseph N. Dolph (1835–1897) was an American politician and attorney in the state of Oregon. 
Cyrus Abda (C. A.) Dolph (1840–1914) was a businessman in Portland, Oregon, United States. 
 Wallace Leroy DeWolf (1854–1930), son of Calvin DeWolf, was an American lawyer, businessman, philanthropist, and artist.

Heraldry

See also 

 Members of the DeWolf family

Notes and references

Further reading 

"Family histories and genealogies. A series of genealogical and biographical monographs..." by Salisbury, Edward Elbridge and Salisbury, Evelyn (McCurdy), 1892.

History of Rhode Island
History of Nova Scotia
American families
Canadian families